The 14th Asian Film Awards was the 2020 edition of the Asian Film Awards. Given the COVID-19 pandemic, the ceremony was held online.

Winners and Nominees
Winners:

Presenters
Anthony Chen – presented Best New Director and Best Cinematography
Nawapol Thamrongrattanarit – presented Best Production Design and Best Visual Effects
Johnny Huang Jingyu – presented Best Costume Design and Best Newcomer
Yang Ik-june – presented Best Original Music and Best Supporting Actor
Samal Yeslyamova – presented Best Sound and Best Actress
Koreeda Hirokazu – presented Best Editing and Best Film
Lee Chang-dong – presented Best Screenplay and Best Director
Kara Wai – presented Best Supporting Actress
Yakusho Koji – presented Best Actor

References

External links

Asian Film Awards ceremonies
2020 film awards
Film